Hlanganani Siphelele Gumbi (born 18 December 1989) is a South African politician. A member of the Democratic Alliance, Gumbi was elected to the eThekwini city council in 2011. In 2014, he was elected to the KwaZulu-Natal Legislature. Gumbi became a member of the National Assembly of South Africa following the 2019 general election. He was appointed Shadow Deputy Minister of Tourism. In 2022, he resigned from the National Assembly to return to the KwaZulu-Natal Legislature. He now serves as the DA KZN Spokesperson on Agriculture and Rural Development.

References

External links
Mr Hlanganani Siphelele Gumbi – People's Assembly
Mr Hlanganani Siphelele Gumbi – Parliament of South Africa

Living people
1989 births
Members of the National Assembly of South Africa
Democratic Alliance (South Africa) politicians
Zulu people
21st-century South African politicians
Politicians from KwaZulu-Natal